Will Owen (born 30 March 1995)  is an English rugby union player.

Club career
Owen plays flanker. He previously played for Nottingham R.F.C, and Leicester Tigers. On 28 January 2017 Owen made his Tigers debut as a substitute in an Anglo-Welsh Cup match against Northampton Saints and was also an unused substitute against Harlequins in an Anglo-Welsh Cup game in January 2014. He has also played for Doncaster Knights on loan during the 2015-16 RFU Championship season, making 7 appearances for Doncaster during this spell.

International career
Owen represented England Under 20s on 12 occasions and played in the 2015 World Rugby Under 20 Championship.

References

1995 births
Living people
Doncaster Knights players
English rugby union players
Leicester Tigers players
Rugby union flankers
Rugby union players from Ipswich